Aleksandar Boljević (Serbian Cyrillic: Александар Бољевић; born 12 December 1995) is a Montenegrin professional footballer who plays as a winger for Israeli Premier League club Hapoel Tel Aviv.

Club career

Zeta
Boljević made his debut for FK Zeta in Montenegro's semi-professional Montenegrin First League in 2011 at the age of 15. His extraordinary talent cemented his place in Zeta's regular starting lineup. Already at the age of 16, Boljević played a key role in Zeta's campaign in the 2012-13 UEFA Europa League qualifying phase. He appeared in all eight Europa League qualifying games that year, making assists against JJK Jyväskylä and FK Sarajevo before playing two matches against PSV Eindhoven. Even though Zeta lost by a staggering 0–14 on aggregate, PSV Eindhoven recognized Boljević and subsequently signed him on a pre-contract which transfers Boljević to PSV in January 2014.

PSV
In his time at PSV, Boljević mostly played for the reserves, Jong PSV. While he did impress there it wasn't enough for coach Phillip Cocu to call him up more regularly for the first team. Boljević made one appearance in the first team. On August 9, 2016, it became clear that Boljević had signed a contract with Belgian club Waasland-Beveren. He had only one season remaining on his contract with PSV.

Waasland-Beveren
On August 9, 2016, Boljević signed a contract with Belgian club Waasland-Beveren. During the 2016–17 season, Boljević made 21 appearances for Waasland-Beveren, recording 4 assists and no goals.

Standard Liège
On June 21, 2019, Boljević signed a contract with Belgian club Standard Liège.

Eupen (loan) 
On January 29, 2021, Boljević moved to Belgium club Eupen, on a loan deal until the end of the season.

Hapoel Tel Aviv
On 26 January 2023, Boljević signed for Israeli Premier League club Hapoel Tel Aviv on a contract until the end of the season.

International career
In 2010, at the age of 14, Boljević represented Montenegro's football team at the 2010 Summer Youth Olympics. He scored a goal against Zimbabwe in the group stage and another goal against Bolivia's team in the tournament's knockout stage.

In August 2012 he participated in the Valeri Lobanovsky Memorial Tournament 2012, where his team lost in the final to  Slovakia on penalties and took home silver medals.

At 17 years of age, Boljević made his debut for the Montenegro national football team on November 17, 2013, in a friendly match against Luxembourg. He has, as of July 2020, earned a total of 17 caps, scoring no goals.

Honors
PSV
Eredivisie:2014-15

References

External links
 
 
 Voetbal International profile 

1995 births
Living people
Footballers from Podgorica
Association football wingers
Montenegrin footballers
Montenegro under-21 international footballers
Montenegro international footballers
Footballers at the 2010 Summer Youth Olympics
FK Zeta players
Jong PSV players
PSV Eindhoven players
S.K. Beveren players
Standard Liège players
K.A.S. Eupen players
Hapoel Tel Aviv F.C. players
Montenegrin First League players
Eerste Divisie players
Eredivisie players
Belgian Pro League players
Israeli Premier League players
Montenegrin expatriate footballers
Expatriate footballers in the Netherlands
Expatriate footballers in Belgium
Expatriate footballers in Israel
Montenegrin expatriate sportspeople in the Netherlands
Montenegrin expatriate sportspeople in Belgium
Montenegrin expatriate sportspeople in Israel